University of the Arts (UArts) is a private art university in Philadelphia, Pennsylvania.  Its campus makes up part of the Avenue of the Arts in Center City, Philadelphia. Dating back to the 1870s, it is one of the oldest schools of art or music in the United States.

The university is composed of two colleges and two Divisions: the College of Art, Media & Design; the College of Performing Arts; the Division of Liberal Arts; and the Division of Continuing Studies. It is accredited by the Middle States Commission on Higher Education. In addition, the School of Music is accredited by the National Association of Schools of Music.

History 

The university was created in 1985 by a merger between the Philadelphia College of the Performing Arts and the Philadelphia College of Art, two schools that trace their origins to the 1870s. In 1870, the Philadelphia Musical Academy was created.  In 1877, the Philadelphia Conservatory of Music was founded.

After graduating from South Philadelphia High School in 1921, Black contralto Marian Anderson applied to the Philadelphia Musical Academy but was turned away because she was "colored."  Today, however, the University's School of Music has a black dean, Kevin Haden.

In 1944, the Children's Dance Theatre, later known as the Philadelphia Dance Academy, was established by Nadia Chilkovsky Nahumck. In 1962, the Conservatory of Music and the Musical Academy merged, then, in 1976, the combined organization acquired the Dance Academy, and renamed itself the Philadelphia College of the  Performing Arts. After establishing a School of Theater in 1983, the institution became the first performing arts college in Pennsylvania to offer a comprehensive range of majors in music, dance and theater.  This institution is now the College of Performing Arts of the University of the Arts.

In 1876, the Pennsylvania Museum and School of Industrial Art was founded as a museum and art school.

In 1938, the museum changed its name to the Philadelphia Museum of Art and the school became the Philadelphia Museum School of Industrial Art. In 1964, the school became independent of the museum and renamed itself the Philadelphia College of Art.

In 1985, the Philadelphia College of Art and the Philadelphia College of the Performing Arts merged to become the Philadelphia Colleges of the Arts, and gained university status as the University of the Arts in 1987.  In 1996, the university added a third academic division, the College of Media and Communication, which merged with the College of Art and Design in 2011 to become the College of Art, Media & Design.

Academics 
The University of the Arts' approximately 1,500 students are enrolled in undergraduate and graduate programs in six schools: Art, Design, Film, Dance, Music, and the Ira Brind School of Theater Arts. In addition, the university offers a PhD in Creativity. The Division of Continuing Studies offers courses through its Continuing Education, Pre-College, Summer Music Studies, and Professional Institute for Educators programs.

Facilities and collections 
The university's campus, in the Avenue of the Arts cultural district of Center City, Philadelphia, comprises six academic buildings and four residence halls. There are 10 performance venues and 12 exhibition/gallery spaces on campus.

The Albert M. Greenfield Library houses 152,067 bound volumes, 6,936 CDs, 14,901 periodicals, 16,820 scores and 1965 videos and DVDs. The Music Library collection holds about 20,000 scores, 15,000 books, 10,000 LP discs, and 8,000 CDs. The Visual Resources Collection includes 175,000 slides. Additional university collections include the University Archives, the Picture File, the Book Arts and Textile Collections, and the Drawing Resource Center.

UArts' 10 galleries include one curated by students. Exhibitions have included the Quay Brothers, Vito Acconci, R. Crumb, Rosalyn Drexler, April Gornik, Alex Grey, James Hyde, Jon Kessler, Donald Lipski, Robert Motherwell, Stuart Netsky, Irving Penn, Jack Pierson, Anne and Patrick Poirier, Yvonne Rainer, Lenore Tawney and Andy Warhol.

The University of the Arts currently has seven theaters. The Levitt Auditorium in Gershman Hall is the largest on campus with a seating capacity of 850. Also in Gershman Hall is a black box theater used for student-run productions. The university's Arts Bank Theater seats 230, and the Laurie Beechman Cabaret Theater is located in the same building. The university also utilizes the adjacent Drake Theater, primarily for dance productions. The Caplan Center for the Performing Arts, located on the 16 & 17th floor of Terra Hall – which opened in 2007, houses two theaters. Its black box theater seats 100 and a recital hall seats 250.

Polyphone Festival

The annual Polyphone Festival of New and Emerging Music, launched in 2016, focuses on the emerging musical. Composers, librettists, directors, choreographers and music directors are invited to the campus to work with students on developing musicals.

Notable alumni 

 Julian Abele, architect
 Richard Amsel, illustrator, recipient of 2009 UArts "Silver Star Alumni Award"
 Maxwell Atoms, animator, The Grim Adventures of Billy & Mandy
 Katie Baldwin, artist
 Robert Barber, member of musical group High Places
 Bo Bartlett, contemporary realist painter
 Bascove, painter and illustrator
 Irene Bedard, actress, voice of Pocahontas
 Howard Benson, rock music producer, Grammy Award winner
 Stan and Jan Berenstain, authors and illustrators, The Berenstain Bears
 Melanie Bilenker, craft artist
 Adam Blackstone, bassist, music director  Grammy Award winner 
 Marc Blitzstein, composer
 Aliki Brandenberg, author and illustrator
 Bryan Brinkman, cartoon animator
 Samuel Joseph Brown Jr., artist, educator
 Du Chisiza, Malawian author, playwright, producer, and Minister of Youth, Sports and Culture
 Claude Clark, artist, art educator
 Stanley Clarke, jazz bassist, Emmy Award and Grammy Award winner
 Emory Cohen, actor, Brooklyn
 Gil Cohen, aviation artist
 Cecelia Condit, video artist
 Rachel Constantine, painter
 Christine Coppa, writer
 Stephen Costello, tenor, Metropolitan Opera
 Joe Dante, film director, Gremlins, The 'Burbs
 Linh Dinh, Poet
 Irv Docktor, artist and illustrator
 Heather Donahue, actress, The Blair Witch Project
 James Doolin, saturated photo realist painter
 George Meade Easby, great-grandson of George Meade and a noted art and antique collector
 Wendy Edwards, painter
 Heather Mae Erickson, artist
 Wharton Esherick, craftsman, printmaker
 Robin Eubanks, jazz trombonist, composer and arranger, Grammy Award winner
 Tatyana Fazlalizadeh, artist
 Paul Felder, acting (2008), professional MMA fighter with the UFC
 Kate Flannery, actress, The Office
 Charles Fracé, wildlife painter
 Meta Vaux Warrick Fuller, sculptor
 Cheryl Goldsleger, contemporary painter
 Sidney Goodman, painter
 David Graham, noted photographer of the American landscape
Justin Guarini, Runner-up on the first season of American Idol
 Roger Hane, book illustrator
 Marshall Harris, photorealist, sculptor and retired professional football player
 Natalie Hinderas, professor, pianist and composer
 Frances Tipton Hunter, artist and illustrator
 Judith Jamison, dancer and choreographer, Alvin Ailey American Dance Theater and American Ballet Theatre
 Carlton Jones Lake, conductor and choirmaster
 Ryan Kattner (aka Honus Honus), musician and songwriter Man Man and Mister Heavenly, actor, screenwriter
 Mohammed Kazem, conceptual artist
 Elle King, singer and songwriter, author of Ex's & Oh's
 Harold Knerr, cartoonist and illustrator for The Katzenjammer Kids
 LaChanze, Broadway actress, Tony Award winner, (The Color Purple)
 Jacob Landau, painter, printmaker, illustrator
 Courtney Lapresi, dancer, MasterChef (season 5) contestant & winner.
Jared Leto, Actor (transferred)
 Amy Mathews, Australian actress on soap opera, Home and Away
 Matt McAndrew, singer and musician, The Voice (U.S. season 7) contestant 
 John Mecray, American realism painter 
 Joseph Menna, sculptor and engraver
 Katherine Milhous, artist/illustrator, Caldecott Medal winner
 Frank Modell (1917–2016), cartoonist
 Ana Ortiz, actress, Ugly Betty & Devious Maids
 Susan Ottaviano, musician, lead singer 'Book of Love (band)" 
 Emi Ozawa, artist
 Leslie Parrish, actress, activist, environmentalist, writer, and producer
 Irving Penn, celebrity portraitist and fashion photographer
 Flo Perkins, glass artist
 Vincent Persichetti, composer, Juilliard professor
 Steve Powers, graffiti artist. Known as ESPO. Painted "Love letter for you" murals in Philadelphia
 Brothers Quay, Timothy and Steven, stop-motion illustrators and filmmakers
 Florence Quivar, mezzo-soprano opera singer, Metropolitan Opera
 James Rolfe, creator, The Angry Video Game Nerd
 Arlen Roth, Guitarist, performer, author, teacher.
 Arnold Roth, cartoonist
 Charles Santore, illustrator
 Cal Schenkel, illustrator and graphic designer, Frank Zappa collaborator
 Richard Schultz, furniture designer
 Lucas Steele, Broadway performer famously known for Natasha, Pierre & The Great Comet of 1812
 Serpentwithfeet, singer
 KaDee Strickland, actress, The Grudge.  2006 UArts’ "Silver Star Alumni Award"
 Nicole Tranquillo, vocalist, American Idol (season 6) contestant
 Constance Walton, composer
 Helen L. Weiss, composer
 Samuel Yellin, blacksmith, sculptor and teacher

Notable faculty 
 Edna Andrade (1917–2008), American geometric abstract painter and early Op Artist, 1996 recipient of the College Art Association Distinguished Teaching of Art Award for her three decades of teaching at Philadelphia College of Art 
 Alexey Brodovitch (1930–1940), photographer, designer, art director
 Gil Cohen, aviation artist
William Daley (born 1925), American ceramist, professor from 1957 until 1990.
 Aaron Levinson, Grammy Award-winning producer and musician
 Camille Paglia (born 1947), author and feminist social critic
 Vincent Persichetti (1915-1987), composer
 Ralph Peterson (1962-2021), jazz drummer
 LaVaughn Robinson (1927–2008), professor from 1980 to 2008, American tap dancer, recognized by the National Endowment for the Arts as a "Living National Treasure"
 Lizbeth Stewart (1948–2013), American ceramist
 Samuel Yellin (1884-1940), master blacksmith

See also 

 Arts education

References

External links 

 

 
Art schools in Pennsylvania
Educational institutions established in 1870
Educational institutions established in 1876
Educational institutions established in 1985
Performing arts education in the United States
Universities and colleges in Philadelphia
Market East, Philadelphia
Rittenhouse Square, Philadelphia
Dance schools in the United States
Performing arts in Pennsylvania
1870 establishments in Pennsylvania
1876 establishments in Pennsylvania
1985 establishments in Pennsylvania
John Haviland buildings
University of the Arts
Glassmaking schools